The Best American Poetry 1997, a volume in The Best American Poetry series, was edited by David Lehman and by guest editor James Tate.

Poets and poems included

See also
 1997 in poetry
Connie Hart    The heart is forever

Notes

External links
 Web page for contents of the book, with links to each publication where the poems originally appeared

Best American Poetry series
1997 poetry books
American poetry anthologies